In statistics, an additive model (AM) is a nonparametric regression method. It was suggested by Jerome H. Friedman and Werner Stuetzle (1981) and is an essential part of the ACE algorithm. The AM uses a one-dimensional smoother to build a restricted class of nonparametric regression models. Because of this, it is less affected by the curse of dimensionality than e.g. a p-dimensional smoother. Furthermore, the AM is more flexible than a standard linear model, while being more interpretable than a general regression surface at the cost of approximation errors. Problems with AM, like many other machine learning methods, include model selection, overfitting, and multicollinearity.

Description
 
or
 
The functions  are unknown smooth functions fit from the data. Fitting the AM (i.e. the functions ) can be done using the backfitting algorithm proposed by Andreas Buja, Trevor Hastie and Robert Tibshirani (1989).

See also
Generalized additive model
Backfitting algorithm
Projection pursuit regression
Generalized additive model for location, scale, and shape (GAMLSS)
Median polish
Projection Pursuit

References

Further reading
Breiman, L. and Friedman, J.H. (1985). "Estimating Optimal Transformations for Multiple Regression and Correlation", Journal of the American Statistical Association 80:580–598. 

Nonparametric regression
Regression models